Marianus is a male name, formerly an Ancient Roman family name, derived from Marius. Marianus may refer to:

Marianus of Auxerre (died 462 or 473), French monk and saint
Marianus Scotus of Mainz (1028–1082 or -83), otherwise Máel Brigte (Devotee of St. Brigid), Irish monk and chronicler
Marianus Scotus of Regensburg (died circa 1088), Irish monk, abbot of St. Peter's at Regensburg
Marianus II of Cagliari (died 1130), also known as Torchitorio II, Judge of Cagliari from c. 1102 to his death
Marianus of Florence (died 1523), Friar Minor, historian, and chronicler of the Franciscan Order
Marianus Brockie, D.D. (1687–1755), Benedictine monk
Jozef Marianus Punt (born 1946), Roman Catholic bishop of Haarlem-Amsterdam in the Netherlands

Marianus of Arborea
Marianus I of Arborea (died 1070), the Judge of Arborea from 1060 to his death
Marianus II of Arborea (died 1297), the Judge of Arborea from 1241 to his death
Marianus III of Arborea (died 1321), the sole Judge of Arborea from 1308 to his death
Marianus IV of Arborea (1329–1376), called the Great, the Judge of Arborea from 1347 to his death
Marianus V of Arborea (1378–1407), the Judge of Arborea from 1387 until his death
Marianus of Torres
Marianus I of Torres (died 1082), the Judge of Logudoro from 1073 until c. 1082
Marianus II of Torres (died 1233), the Judge of Logudoro from 1218 until his death

See also
Codex Marianus, Glagolitic fourfold Gospel Book that is one of the oldest manuscript witnesses to the Old Church Slavonic language
Doctor Marianus disambiguation page
Mariana (disambiguation)
Mariani (disambiguation)
Mariano
Marianum
Marinus disambiguation page
Merianus

References

Masculine given names
Ancient Roman nomina